The Petersen Quartet was a string quartet founded in 1979 by students at the Hanns Eisler Music Conservatory in Berlin, including founding first violinist, Ulrike Petersen, who has recently rejoined the quartet to alternate in the first chair with Conrad Muck. They have been guided by, amongst others, Sandor Vegh, Thomas Brandis and the Amadeus Quartet. The quartet has not been active since autumn 2009.

Members

 Violin: Conrad Muck (since 1992)
 Violin: Ulrike Petersen (1979-1992, since 2008), Gernot Süßmuth (1979-2000), Daniel Bell (2000-2008) 
 Viola: Ula Ulijona (since 2007), Friedemann Weigle (1979-2007)
 Cello: Henry-David Varema (since 2000), Hans-Jakob Eschenburg (1979-2000), Jonas Krejci

External links
Official website in English
Official website in German

Musical groups established in 1979
German musical groups
German string quartets
Musical groups from Berlin